Pleurophyllum criniferum is a species of flowering plant in the family Asteraceae that is endemic to the subantarctic islands of New Zealand.

Description
Pleurophyllum criniferum is a large perennial herb, growing up to 2 m in height.  The leaves may grow to a metre or more in length and are diverse in shape, though usually oblong-ovate to lanceolate, the undersides covered by silky white hairs.  The flowers occur as 15–30 heads in elongated racemes with short and inconspicuous ray-florets and dark purple disk-florets.  The plant flowers from December to February and fruits from January to May.

Distribution and habitat
The plant is endemic to New Zealand’s subantarctic Antipodes, Auckland and Campbell Islands, where it is a striking component of the megaherb community.  It occurs from the coast up into the island ranges on peaty ground in herbfields.

References

criniferum
Flora of the Auckland Islands
Flora of the Antipodes Islands
Flora of the Campbell Islands
Taxa named by Joseph Dalton Hooker